The team event competition of the 2014 European Aquatics Championships was held on 18 August.

Results
The event was held at 14:30.

References

2014 European Aquatics Championships
European Aquatics Championships